Andrew Wilson (born 29 March 1994) is an English professional golfer.  

As an amateur, Wilson competed on the British Universities and Colleges Sport circuit. He also competed at the Men’s Home Internationals.

Wilson qualified for the 2019 Open Championship through regional qualifying at Notts Golf Club. This was his first major championship. He finished tied for 32nd.

Wilson played on the PGA EuroPro Tour in 2019, winning the Motocaddy Masters in early July.

Amateur wins
2013 North of England Open Youths
2014 BUCS Student Tour - Dundonald, BUCS Student Tour 1
2016 BUCS Golf Tour - Dundonald Tournament
2017 BUCS Golf Tour - English & Welsh Championships, Lee Westwood Trophy

Source:

Professional wins (1)

PGA EuroPro Tour wins (1)

Results in major championships

"T" = tied for place

See also
2021 Challenge Tour graduates
2022 European Tour Qualifying School graduates

References

External links

English male golfers
European Tour golfers
1994 births
Living people